Richard "Richie" Kehoe (born 9 March 1986) is an Irish sportsperson.  He plays hurling with his local club Faythe Harriers and plays for the Wexford inter-county team.

Playing career

Club
Kehoe plays hurling with his local club Faythe Harriers.

Inter-county

Kehoe first came to prominence on the inter-county scene as a member of the Wexford minor team in 2002. He however had very little success during that. He later joined the U21 team the year after where he remained for two years. 2006 saw Kehoe being called to the senior team while he was still playing in the U21 team but the senior turned out to be a poor year as they were defeated heavily by Kilkenny and later by Clare.

References

1986 births
Living people
Faythe Harriers hurlers
Wexford inter-county hurlers